Delaplace is a French surname. Notable people with the surname include:

Anthony Delaplace (born 1989), French road cyclist
Barbara Delaplace (1952–2022), Canadian science fiction author
Jonathan Delaplace (born 1986), French footballer

French-language surnames